Jim M. Nichols is American college administrator and former football coach. He was the first head football coach at Faulkner University in Montgomery, Alabama, leading the Faulkner Eagles in its first two seasons of play, 2007 and 2008. Nichols was hired at Faulkner in 2006 following three seasons as a graduate assistant at Auburn University, where he worked under head football coach Tommy Tuberville.

Nichols was the athletics director at Mount Dora Christian Academy in Mount Dora, Florida from 2015 to 2018 and was the school's head football coach in 2016. He resigned in December 2018 to take a job as Assistant Athletic Director and Chief of Staff for Liberty University in Lynchburg, Virginia. Nichols is now the Vice President of University and Athletic development for Liberty University.

Nichols was born in Camden, Arkansas and grew up in Searcy, Arkansas, where he went to Searcy High School and graduated from Harding University.

Head coaching record

College

References

External links
 Liberty University profile
 Liberty football profile

1975 births
Living people
Auburn Tigers football coaches
Faulkner Eagles football coaches
Texas Tech Red Raiders football coaches
Troy Trojans football coaches
High school football coaches in Florida
Harding University alumni
People from Camden, Arkansas
People from Searcy, Arkansas
Coaches of American football from Arkansas